The Marine Scotland Directorate is a directorate of the Scottish Government. Marine Scotland manages Scotland's seas and freshwater fisheries along with delivery partners NatureScot and the Scottish Environment Protection Agency.

Marine Scotland provides management and research of devolved responsibilities such as:
 Licensing of marine activities.
 Sea fisheries.
 Salmon and recreational fishing.
 Marine renewable energy.
 Marine conservation.
 Marine spatial planning.
 Scientific research including sea and freshwater fisheries.
 Enforcement of marine and fisheries law.

History
The Marine Scotland directorate was established on 1 April 2009, merging two executive agencies (Fisheries Research Services and the Scottish Fisheries Protection Agency) and the Scottish Government marine and fishery policy divisions.

Staff, assets and budget
Marine Scotland has around 700 staff, covering a range of professions including scientists, sea fishery officers, sailors, policy, administrative and professional/ technical staff.

Locations and Assets

Staff are located across Scotland including :
 Major Scottish Government offices, for example Victoria Quay and Atlantic Quay.
 The marine laboratory in Aberdeen.
 Freshwater laboratories at Faskally and Montrose.
 Fishery offices at Eyemouth, Anstruther, Peterhead, Fraserburgh, Buckie, Kirkwall, Lerwick, Scrabster, Kinlochbervie, Lochinver, Ullapool, Stornoway, Portree, Mallaig, Oban, Campbeltown, and Ayr.

Marine Research Vessels
Marine Scotland operates two main research vessels which are fitted with a wide range of deployment and recovery facilities for fishing gear and equipment, scientific and environmental sensors, and data gathering systems: 
MRV Scotia (launched: 1998, length: 68.6 meters, service speed: 13 knots)
 (launched: 2008, length: 27 meters, cruise speed: 8 knots)

Additionally, MRV Temora (launched: 1992, length: 10 meters, max speed: 10 knots) is used for sampling as part of the Long Term Climate Change Monitoring Programme.

Marine Protection Vessels
Marine Scotland operates three Marine Protection Vessels (MPVs): 
MPV Minna (launched: 2003, length: 42 meters, top speed: 14 knots, tonnage: 718 g.r.t.)
MPV Jura (launched: 2005, length: 84 meters, top speed: 18 knots, tonnage: 2,181 g.r.t.)
MPV Hirta (launched: 2008, length: 84 meters, top speed: 18 knots, tonnage: 2,181 g.r.t.)

Surveillance Aircraft
Marine Scotland owns two Reims Cessna F-406 Caravan II aircraft for aerial surveillance, operated by Airtask.

UK Fisheries Monitoring Centre
Marine Scotland operates the UK Fisheries Monitoring Centre (UKFMC), on behalf of the four UK fisheries administrations. The UKFMC acts as the UK single-point-of-contact for manual reporting of ERS, VMS and other EU/national fisheries schemes.

Divisions

Director's Office
Annabel Turpie is the Director of Marine Scotland. The Director's Office provides corporate services such as business management, communications, information quality, data management, statistics, socio-economic and  geographic analysis.

Compliance (MSC)
The Compliance division monitors and enforces marine and sea fishing laws in Scottish waters. It reports as appropriate to the Scottish prosecuting authorities and provides intelligence on fishing activity in the seas around Scotland.

Science (MSS)
Marine Scotland's Science division undertakes research and provides scientific and technical advice to the Scottish Government (and the UK and European Union authorities) on a number of marine and fisheries issues including aquaculture and fish health, freshwater fisheries, sea fisheries and the marine ecosystem in Scotland's seas.

Marine Planning & Policy (MPP)
Marine Scotland's Planning & Policy division covers three main policy areas and the Licensing Operations Team (LOT).

Marine Spatial Planning
Marine Scotland are involved in marine spatial planning at both at a national and regional level. Scotland's Marine Atlas was published in 2011  as a baseline assessment, with Scotland's first National Marine Plan published in 2015. The information from the Atlas and National Marine Plan is available through Marine Scotland Maps and Marine Scotland Information portals. These portals form part of the Marine Scotland Open Data Network which contributes towards Marine Scotland's INSPIRE and open data obligations

Offshore Marine Renewables
The Scottish Government is developing plans for offshore wind, wave and tidal energy in Scottish waters. Marine Scotland will explore how offshore wind, wave and tidal energy can contribute to meeting Scotland's target of generating the equivalent of 100% of electricity demand from renewable sources and also seek to maximise the contribution of these technologies to achieving a low-carbon economy.

Marine Conservation
Marine Scotland follows a strategy for Marine Nature Conservation in Scotland's Seas based on the three pillars of species conservation, site protection, and wider seas policies and measures. Work continues on a Marine Protected Area network with 30 nature conservation MPAs designated in 2014.

Licensing Operations Team (LOT)
The Marine Scotland Licensing Operations team is a central point-of-contact for activities such as depositing or removing objects or substances from the seabed; construction or alteration works, dredging; depositing or using explosives.

Aquaculture and Recreational Fisheries (ARF)
The ARF division handles policy areas covering Aquaculture, Salmon & Recreational Fisheries, Fishery Grants, Post-EU Referendum (Brexit) and the Crown Estate in Scotland.

Sea Fisheries
The Sea Fisheries division handles policy areas covering Access to Sea Fisheries, EU Quota Negotiations and Discards, Inshore Fisheries and Coastal Communities, and International Fisheries and Environmental Interactions.

See also
Fishing in Scotland
Marine (Scotland) Act 2010
Marine Management Organisation (of the UK Government)
Border Force

References

External links
Marine Scotland
The fleet of Marine Protection Vessels of Marine Scotland
Marine and Fisheries in Scotland
Marine (Scotland) Act 2010
Marine Scotland Strategic Plan 2013-2016 
Marine Scotland Vision

 

Directorates of the Scottish Government
2009 establishments in Scotland
Scottish coast
Conservation in Scotland
Environment of Scotland
Fishing in Scotland
Government research
Law enforcement agencies of Scotland